The Devonshire wainscot (Leucania putrescens) is a species of moth of the family Noctuidae. It is found in southern Europe, North Africa, Turkey, Israel, Lebanon.

Technical description and variation

S. putrescens H. G. (= boisduvalii Dup.) (25 d). Distinguished from punctosa by the greyer tone and black irroration; a black streak from base below cell; the white spot at lower end of cell round, not elongated ; terminal interspaces with black streaks. - Larva reddish ochreous; lines pale edged with dark; the subdorsal lines not interrupted. Subsp. canariensis Rbl., [ now full species Leucania canariensis Rebel, 1894] from the Canary islands, is smaller, the forewing darker, with a distinct black cellspot on underside.

Biology
Adults are on wing from October to November. There is one generation per year.

The larvae feed on various Gramineae species.

Subspecies
Leucania putrescens putrescens
Leucania putrescens vallettai

References

External links

Hadeninae of Israel
Lepiforum.de

Leucania
Moths described in 1824
Moths of Europe
Moths of Asia
Moths of the Middle East
Taxa named by Jacob Hübner